The Swedish Rugby Union is the governing body for rugby union in Sweden. The Stockholm Rugby Union was founded on 29 May 1932. It is unclear exactly when it became the "Swedish Rugby Union", but it is supposed to have occurred sometime between 1932 and 1936. It became affiliated to the International Rugby Board in 1988.

See also
Sweden national rugby union team
Rugby union in Sweden

References

External links 
 Official site

Rugby
Rugby union governing bodies in Europe
Rugby union in Sweden
Sports organizations established in 1932
1932 establishments in Sweden